Ádám Bódi (born 14 October 1990) is a Hungarian professional footballer who currently plays for Debreceni VSC.

Club career

Debrecen
Bódi won the 2009–10 season of the Hungarian League with Debrecen despite his team lost to Kecskeméti TE in the last round. In 2010 Debrecen beat Zalaegerszegi TE in the Hungarian Cup final in the Puskás Ferenc Stadium by 3–2.

On 1 May 2012 Bódi won the Hungarian Cup with Debrecen by beating MTK Budapest on penalty shoot-out in the 2011–12 season. This was the fifth Hungarian Cup trophy for Debrecen.

On 12 May 2012 Bódi won the Hungarian League title with Debrecen after beating Pécs in the 28th round of the Hungarian League by 4–0 at the Oláh Gábor út Stadium which resulted the sixth Hungarian League title for the Hajdús.

Club statistics

Updated to games played as of 15 May 2022.

References

External links
Player profile at HLSZ 
goal.com profile
Debreceni VSC Official Site profile

1990 births
Living people
People from Nyíregyháza
Hungarian footballers
Hungary international footballers
Association football midfielders
Debreceni VSC players
Fehérvár FC players
Nemzeti Bajnokság I players
Sportspeople from Szabolcs-Szatmár-Bereg County